Gymnelia is a genus of moths in the subfamily Arctiinae. The genus was erected by Francis Walker in 1854.

Species

Former species
Gymnelia cocho (Schaus, 1896)

References

External links

 
Euchromiina
Moth genera